The Louis A. R. Pieri Memorial Award is an American Hockey League (AHL) trophy awarded annually to the most outstanding coach during the season, as voted upon by members of the AHL media. 

The award is named for Louis Pieri, a long-time contributor to the AHL as owner of the Providence Reds.

Award winners

References

External links
Official AHL website
AHL Hall of Fame

American Hockey League trophies and awards